The University of Bath School of Management in Bath, England, is the international business school of the University of Bath.  It was established in 1966 and is considered one of the most prestigious business schools in both the UK and the world.

The School offers a range of courses including undergraduate, postgraduate and PhD, as well as executive education for individuals and organisations. The Bath MBA is offered as a one-year full-time programme or as a part-time Executive programme.

Accreditation 

Bath is one of a number of international business schools to have been accredited by EQUIS, the European Foundation for Management Development's (EFMD) quality inspectorate. The Bath MBA has been fully accredited since 1976 by the Association of MBAs (AMBA).

Degree programmes 

The school offers a range of degrees from undergraduate through to doctoral and post-experience programmes.

There are 11 undergraduate courses, ranging from Accounting and Finance to International Management, and a wide range of Master's courses, including Marketing and Finance with Banking.

The Bath MBA 

The Bath MBA is an intensive programme designed for mature individuals with several years' relevant, postgraduate experience. The programme is available in both full-time and part-time, executive formats. The Bath MBA has been AMBA-accredited since 1976.

Doctoral 
The school offers two research degrees: a PhD, and a specialist Doctor of Business Administration (DBA) in Higher Education Management.

Reputation

The School currently ranks in the top 5 in the UK in the three main national undergraduate rankings (The Times & Sunday Times Good University Guide, The Guardian University Guide 2023 and the Complete University Guide 2023). The Complete University Guide 2023 ranks the School 1st for Marketing, a position it's held since 2017.

The Bath MBA programme is ranked 2nd in the UK in the Corporate Knights Better World MBA rankings 2022. 

In the latest UK government's Research Excellence Framework, 56% of the School's submissions met the 4* standard (the highest possible). According to the Times Higher Education's REF analysis, the School was placed 7th in the UK for business and management studies.

Faculty 

The School has over 100 teaching and research staff, with a support team of around 90 managerial and administrative staff. All academic faculty are members of a division and often a research centre.

Divisions 

 Accounting Finance & Law
 Marketing Business & Society
 Information, Decisions & Operations
 Strategy & Organisation

Research centres and networks 
 Centre for Business, Organisations and Society
 Centre for Governance, Regulation and Industrial Strategy
 Centre for Healthcare Innovation and Improvement
 Centre for Research on Entrepreneurship and Innovation
 Centre for Smart Warehousing and Logistics Systems
 Centre for Strategic Change and Leadership
 Future of Work
 Identities in Organisations research centre
 International Centre for Higher Education Management

Notable alumni 
 Justin King, CEO, Sainsbury's
 Bob Wigley, Chairman, Merrill Lynch International (Europe, Middle East and Africa)
 Athena Andreadis, musician
 Peter Harrison (businessman), CEO, Schroders
 Russell Senior, ex Pulp guitarist
 Terence Thomas, Baron Thomas of Macclesfield, CBE Former chairman, Northwest Development Agency (1999–2002) and former managing director of the Co-operative Bank
 Ash Atalla, television producer
 Nigel Healey, Vice Chancellor, Fiji National University
 James Shaw, New Zealand minister
 Sir Julian Horn-Smith, former COO of Vodafone
 Stewart Till, Chairman of United International Pictures and Millwall FC
 Stephen Kelly (businessman), former CEO, Sage Group

See also 
 University of Bath
 City of Bath

References

External links 
 University of Bath School of Management Website
 The Bath MBA Website

School of Management
Bath
Educational institutions established in 1966
1966 establishments in England